Jonathan Bayliss (September 7, 1926 in Arlington, Massachusetts – April 15, 2009 in Gloucester, Massachusetts) was an American novelist and playwright who lived and wrote in Gloucester, Massachusetts. He was a close friend of poet Charles Olson after Olson's return to Gloucester in the late 1950s. Correspondence between Bayliss and Olson from 1958 to January 1970 was published by the Cape Ann Museum. Bayliss's highly innovative and polymathic novels employ a vast vocabulary, contain mathematical and philosophical puzzles, and avoid pop culture references in favor of historical and mythological allusions. He wrote two plays loosely based on the Sumerian Gilgamesh epic, The Tower of Gilgamesh and The Acts of Gilgamesh.

Gloucesterman
Bayliss's Gloucesterman fiction tetralogy explores the concepts of mythology and ritual throughout history; the value of collective human endeavor to society; the tension between the mysteries of art and science; and the degradation of culture through economic exploitation. The novel Gloucesterbook and its sequel Gloucestertide create a fiction-world out of Gloucester similar to the Wessex of Thomas Hardy. The introductory volume Prologos was published in 1999. The final volume of the tetralogy, Gloucestermas, was published in 2010.

Works
 Gloucesterbook (Protean Press, Rockport MA 1992)
 Gloucestertide (Protean Press, Rockport MA 1996)
 Prologos (Basilicum Press, Ashburnham MA 1999)
 Gloucestermas (Fontis Press, Westborough, MA 2010)
 Democratic Oak Tree (Drawbridge Press, Gloucester, MA 2016)
 Gilgamesh Plays (Drawbridge Press, Gloucester, MA 2017)

References

External links
 Drawbridge Press Current publisher of Bayliss's novels, plays, and political essays.
 Jonathan Bayliss Society A literary society established to foster appreciation of Jonathan Bayliss's life and works. 
Jonathan Bayliss 1926 - 2009 This is the transcription of a eulogy delivered on April 27, 2009, at a memorial service for  Bayliss, at St. John's Episcopal Church in Gloucester, Massachusetts. It was written by Peter Anastas and could also be described as a "memoir of a friendship".
 Gloucesterman Website relating to Jonathan's Bayliss fiction tetralogy Gloucesterman; includes links to audio and video recordings of readings and related materials.

20th-century American novelists
20th-century American male writers
1926 births
2009 deaths
People from Gloucester, Massachusetts
American male novelists
Burials at Mount Auburn Cemetery